is a railway station in Fukushima-ku, Osaka, Japan, on the JR West Osaka Loop Line.  The Station is connected to Tamagawa Station (S12) on the Osaka Metro Sennichimae Line.

Layout
There is an island platform with two tracks elevated.

History
The station opened on 5 April 1898.

Station numbering was introduced in March 2018 with Teradacho being assigned station number JR-O13.

Around the station

Adjacent stations

References

Fukushima-ku, Osaka
Railway stations in Osaka Prefecture
Railway stations in Japan opened in 1898
Railway stations in Osaka
Osaka Loop Line